Protonympha is a form genus for problematic fossils of Devonian age in New York. It has been of special interest because of its morphological similarity with the iconic Ediacaran fossil Spriggina, and may have been a late surviving vendobiont.

Description 
Protonympha is a flat, quilted fossil, which has previously been compared with the arm of a starfish or an annelid worm, but lacks a segmented carapace or stereom. Its preservation in sandstone is similar to Ediacaran type preservations. A less-accepted hypothesis claims the organisms were terrestrial fossils like lichen, with hypothetically interpreted rhizoid-like extensions as possible evidence it may have lived on land or in shallow pools.

References 

Devonian animals
Controversial taxa
Enigmatic prehistoric animal genera